The 1997 Army Cadets football team was an American football team that represented the United States Military Academy in the 1997 NCAA Division I-A football season. In their seventh season under head coach Bob Sutton, the Cadets compiled a 4–7 record and were outscored by their opponents by a combined total of 311 to 221.  In the annual Army–Navy Game, the Cadets lost to Navy, 39–7.

Schedule

References

Army
Army Black Knights football seasons
Army Cadets football